Arkadi Olegovich Imrekov (born 14 December 1985) is a Russian professional football manager and a former player.

Club career
He made his Russian Football National League debut for FC Dynamo Makhachkala on 29 March 2006 in a game against FC Angusht Nazran.

Personal life
His twin brother Viktor Imrekov and father Oleg Imrekov are also professional footballers.

External links
 

1985 births
Sportspeople from Omsk
Living people
Russian footballers
Association football midfielders
Russian twins
Twin sportspeople
FC Dynamo Moscow reserves players
FC Vityaz Podolsk players
FC KAMAZ Naberezhnye Chelny players
Russian football managers
FC Ararat Moscow managers
FC Mashuk-KMV Pyatigorsk players
FC Dynamo Makhachkala players